Attorney General Barry may refer to:

Redmond Barry (lord chancellor) (1866–1913), Attorney-General for Ireland 
Charles Robert Barry (1825–1897), Attorney-General for Ireland